The 1988 Tour du Haut Var was the 20th edition of the Tour du Haut Var cycle race and was held on 27 February 1988. The race started in Sainte-Maxime and finished in Grimaud. The race was won by Luc Roosen.

General classification

References

1988
1988 in road cycling
1988 in French sport
February 1988 sports events in Europe